William Randall Roberts (February 6, 1830 – August 9, 1897) was a Fenian Brotherhood member, United States Representative from New York (1871–1875), and a United States Ambassador to Chile. Roberts, an Irish immigrant who became a wealthy businessman, rose quickly to a position of major influence amongst the Fenian Brotherhood before eventually taking leadership. Under his direction, the Fenians in America moved to use Irish-American veterans of the American Civil War to invade Canada in the hopes that they could leverage this against the British Empire to negotiate for an Independent Irish Republic. After the first attempt to invade Canada was not successful, Roberts resigned from the leadership of the Fenians and began to transition into American politics. He served as a United States Representative from New York and Ambassador to Chile until a stroke ended his career.

Biography

Early life
Roberts was born in Mitchelstown, County Cork, Ireland, the son of baker Randall Roberts and Mary Roberts (née Bishop). Roberts was educated in Cork before he immigrated to the United States in July 1849, aged 19, with the rest of his family. Roberts worked as a clerk for a dry goods company in New York for many years before he set up his own own successful dry goods business, the ‘Crystal Palace’, which he would run until his retirement in 1869.

Fenian
Roberts joined the newly-emerging Fenian Brotherhood in 1863, an organisation made up of the Irish diaspora in America that was dedicated to establishing an independent Irish Republic. The Fenian Brotherhood operated as the American support wing of the Irish Republican Brotherhood, a secret society controlling the movement. Roberts, whose wealth allowed him to regularly donate to the organisation, quickly found himself amassing influence amongst the American Fenians. During the American Civil War, which raged from 1861 to 1864, thousands of Irishmen had joined the ranks of the Union Army, gaining military experience and were often now influenced by the idea of Radical Republicanism. The leader of the Fenian Brotherhood, the scholarly John O'Mahony (who himself served as an officer in the Union Army), thought the Irish veterans should be deployed to Ireland post-haste for a rebellion there, funded by the Irish in America. However, Roberts quickly became the leader of a faction of Fenians with an alternative plan. Roberts and his supporters argued instead that the Fenians should gather the Irish veterans and their resources, and instead attack Canada with the hopes of securing at least one Canadian region. By holding part of Canada, Roberts and his faction believed they could either hold that region for ransom from the British, or divert British military forces out of Ireland and into Canada, thereby leaving Ireland vulnerable to a rebellion. A subtext to Roberts and his faction's argument was that many veterans of the Union Army were angered by British support for the Confederacy during the war, and sought a measure of revenge by attacking Canada, regardless if this furthered Fenian objectives or not.

In February 1865, with the Civil war now finished, thousands of Fenians assembled for a convention in Cincinnati, Ohio. There Roberts' faction revised the Fenian Constitution by adding a preamble modelled on the Declaration of Independence as well as introducing of a number of checks and balances which effectively stripped O’Mahony of most of his power. The most notable of these changes were the introduction of a "senate" to advise the President of the Brotherhood, with most senators being made up of Roberts' supporters.

In October 1865 the Fenian Brotherhood held another convention in Philadelphia. In the days beforehand, Roberts lead a delegation of Fenians to a meeting with William Seward, the US secretary of state, and President Andrew Johnson. When Roberts' group pointedly asked what the Johnson Administration's response to a Fenian invasion of Canada would be, their reply was sufficiently vague enough for the Fenian delegation to believe they could launch the plan without significant resistance. Roberts arrived at the Philadelphia convention and relayed his account to the assembly. With the assembled Fenians enthralled by the report that the American government would not stand in their way should they raid Canada, Roberts and his faction would make a heave against O'Mahony. But before they did, O'Mahoney attempted to make a stand, proposing a motion supported by his mentor and the head of the IRB James Stephens; O'Mahoney proposed that longstanding US Army veteran Thomas William Sweeny be named "Secretary of War". Unbeknownst to either O'Mahoney or Stephens though, was the fact that Sweeny was also a supporter of the plan to invade Canada. Sweeney was elected to the position, but regardless, the senate faction pushed for another chance in the Fenian Brotherhood's constitution, which would replace the office of President (which O'Mahony held) entirely with the senate, which would be headed by Roberts. Before a rancorous convention, Roberts' "Senate" faction succeeded and O'Mahony was deposed.

Raids on Canada

During the early summer of 1866, thousands of armed, uniformed and supplied Fenians crossed the border from the US into Canada as part of an invasion. Although having some initial success against inexperienced Canadian militias, the Fenians were undone by poor logistics and the American government moving swiftly to block their efforts, fearing their activity would the pretext for a war between the US and the British. Roberts participated in the invasion, and for his part, he was arrested in New York on 7 June. He would be detained until 15 June. 3 days later, Roberts (thanks to the support of Irish-American politicians) was allowed to deliver an address to the US Senate appealing for them to support amnesty for IRB prisoners in Ireland. Afterwards, Roberts went on a speaking tour of America, where he told audiences that American politicians would not receive the support of the Irish community unless they supported Fenianism. Perhaps aware that this might be an accurate reading of sentiments, in September 1866 President Johnson ordered that the arms seized by the United States army from the Fenian during the invasion be returned.

In March 1867, Fenians in Ireland launched the Rebellion of 1867. Although augmented by a number of veterans of the US Civil war acting as leaders, the effort was generally a disorganised failure, partially bourne out of the Fenians' inability to decide whether their focus should be on Ireland or Canada. In the aftermath Roberts sent men on his behalf to take control of the Irish Republicanhood Brotherhood. In June 1867, Fenians from both Ireland and American assembled in Paris for a convention to decide their next move. Roberts proposed that the IRB replace the office of President with a "Supreme Council", of which he would be the head. While the motion to create a Supreme Council succeeded, Roberts was not named the new leader. Incensed, Roberts resigned as leader of the Senate faction on 31 December 1867 and began to withdraw from revolutionary Fenianism. In 1870 he opposed more raids into Canada. In January 1871 Roberts led a welcoming committee in New York for five recently released IRB leaders who had been exiled from Ireland by the British. This would be amongst the last of his Fenian activities as Roberts' attention shifted to American politics.

Career in politics
Roberts was elected to the House of Representatives as a Democrat twice, to the Forty-second and Forty-third Congresses (March 4, 1871 – March 4, 1875). As a congressman, Roberts criticised the Republican government for its policy towards the former confederate states, opposed the increasing power of railroad barons, advocated for greater protection for American citizens living in foreign countries (with Fenians imprisoned in Canada in mind), supported civil rights for black people and was critical of British foreign policy. His finances prevented him from seeking further re-election to that office, but after his time in the House he was a member of the board of aldermen of New York City in 1877 and was an unsuccessful candidate for sheriff in 1879. y. In 1882 Roberts supported Grover Cleveland for the governorship of New York as well as Cleveland's 1884 successful bid for the US presidency. As a reward, Roberts was appointed as Envoy Extraordinary and Minister Plenipotentiary to Chile by now President Cleveland on April 2, 1885, serving until August 19, 1889. He was succeeded in the position by Patrick Egan, a fellow Irishman and also a former member of the IRB.

Roberts' term as Envoy to Chile had been cut short when he suffered a paralytic stroke in May 1888. Roberts returned to a New York City hospital for medical care, but was never able to recover his health and died nine years later on 9 August 1897. He was buried in Calvary Cemetery, Woodside, New York. He was survived by a wife and son, but whom he had been separated from before his stroke.

References 

1830 births
1897 deaths
19th-century American diplomats
Burials at Calvary Cemetery (Queens)
Irish emigrants to the United States (before 1923)
Members of the Irish Republican Brotherhood
People of the Fenian raids
Politicians from County Cork
Politicians from New York City
Ambassadors of the United States to Chile
Democratic Party members of the United States House of Representatives from New York (state)
19th-century American politicians
American activists for Irish independence